State Route 103 (SR 103) is a secondary state highway in Dyer County, Tennessee, USA.  It runs from the Mississippi River east to State Route 78 in Bogota.  This highway crosses State Route 181 and passes through the small communities of Miston and Tennemo.  The first  of this highway are gravel and is subject to flooding from the Mississippi River, this section is unsigned in the field but maintained by TDOT as SR 103.

Major intersections

References
Dyer County Highway Map
Tennessee Department of Transportation

103
Transportation in Dyer County, Tennessee